John Bassett (by 1503 – 1550 or 1551) of Uley in Gloucestershire, was an English politician.

Family
He married twice, firstly to a widow, Faith née Love, and secondly to a woman named Joan.

Career
He was a Member (MP) of the Parliament of England for Midhurst in 1529.

References

1551 deaths
English MPs 1529–1536
Year of birth uncertain
People from Uley